The deep palmar arch, an arterial network is accompanied by a pair of venae comitantes which constitute the deep venous palmar arch. It receives the veins corresponding to the branches of the arterial arch: the palmar metacarpal veins.

References

Veins of the upper limb